Ruth Osime (born 7 February 1964) is a Nigerian journalist. She is the former editor of THISDAY Style Magazine, a fashion and style pullout magazine of THISDAY Newspaper.

Personal life 
Osime is the daughter of Chief Grace Osime and has two sisters, Grace Osime and Omome Osime-Oloyede.

Career 
Osime's career at THISDAY began with her as a project manager, then she became a writer and style editor in 2003, a position she held till April 2022. She also contributed to the Sunday publication of the newspaper with a column known as Truth by Ruth, before becoming the editor of THISDAY Style in 2005, when the magazine was launched.  She is the co-producer of the annual ARISE Fashion Week and headed the panel of judges for the 2020 edition of the fashion show. In 2021, she sat as a judge for Lafarge Africa's annual National Literacy Competition for teachers and students.

Recognition 
Osime made it to the list of 25 Most Powerful Women in Nigerian journalism in 2020, coming 12th on the list compiled by Women in Journalism Africa.

Award 
Osime is a recipient of the 2021 Embracing All Tone of Women (E.A.T.O.W) Icons Award, in recognition of her contributions to the fashion and style industry.

References 

Nigerian women journalists
Nigerian journalists
1964 births
Living people